Ziarat is a town in Balochistan, Pakistan.

Ziarat may also refer to the following places

Iran
Ziarat Rural District (disambiguation)

Bushehr Province
Ziarat, Dashtestan, Bushehr Province, Iran
Ziarat, Dashti, Bushehr Province, Iran

Golestan Province
Ziarat, Golestan, Iran

Hormozgan Province
Ziarat, Bandar Abbas, Hormozgan Province, Iran
Ziarat, Bandar Lengeh, Hormozgan Province, Iran
Ziarat, Parsian, Hormozgan Province
Ziarat, Rudan, Hormozgan Province
Ziarat-e Ali, Hormozgan Province, Iran
Ziarat-e Bozorg, Hormozgan Province, Iran
Ziarat-e Hasanabad, Hormozgan Province, Iran
Ziarat Mowla, Hormozgan Province, Iran
Ziarat-e Pakuh, Hormozgan Province, Iran
Ziarat-e Pirchugan, Hormozgan Province, Iran
Ziarat-e Seyyed Soleyman, Hormozgan Province, Iran
Ziarat-e Talang, Hormozgan Province, Iran

Kerman Province
Ziarat, Kerman, Kerman Province
Ziarat, Manujan, Kerman Province
Ziarat, Qaleh Ganj, Kerman Province
Ziarat-e Bacheh, Kerman Province
Ziarat-e Hezart Abbas, Kerman Province, Iran
Ziarat-e Kot-e Gorg, Kerman Province, Iran
Ziyarat Boneh, Kerman Province
Ziyarat Shah, Kerman Province

Mazandaran Province
Ziarat Var, a village in Abbasabad County

North Khorasan Province
Ziarat, North Khorasan, Iran

Razavi Khorasan Province
Ziarat, Mashhad, a village in Razavi Khorasan Province, Iran
Ziarat, Nishapur, a village in Razavi Khorasan Province, Iran

Sistan and Baluchestan Province
Ziarat, Dalgan, a village in Dalgan County
Ziyarat-e Miromar, a village in Dalgan County
Ziarat Konar, a village in Khash County

South Khorasan Province
Ziarat-e Seyyed Ali, South Khorasan Province, Iran

Pakistan
Ziarat, a town in Balochistan, Pakistan
Ziarat District

Syria
al-Ziyarah, a village in the Hama Governorate, Syria
al-Ziyarah Nahiyah, a subdistrict of the Qalaat al-Madiq District of Hama Governorate

See also
Ziyarat, a form of pilgrimage in Islam
Ziarat is a common element in Iranian place names; see 
Poshteh-ye Ziarat (disambiguation)